In mathematics, Einstein function is a name occasionally used for one of the functions

References

 E W Lemmon, R Span, 2006, Short Fundamental Equations of State for 20 Industrial Fluids, J. Chem. Eng. Data 51 (3), 785–850 .
 Wolfram MathWorld: http://mathworld.wolfram.com/EinsteinFunctions.html

Special functions